Edward Taylor Paull (February 16, 1858 – November 25, 1924) was a minor American composer, arranger, and sheet music publisher.

Personal life

He was born in Gerrardstown, in what is now West Virginia, and died in Brooklyn, NY.

Musical career

He had some success with a few titles which enabled him to set up his own self-publishing company. His music was intended for the piano sheet music trade.

His first publication was for the Richmond Music Company in Richmond, VA where he was general manager.  The first publication was The Chariot Race or Ben Hur March with a full-color cover.  Paull's success with Ben Hur, prompted him to use it in his marketing as he moved into the music teaching market and the phonograph manufacturing business.

He began publishing in 1894, specializing in marches.  He is known for his 1905 march entitled, Paul Revere's Ride which was dedicated to the Daughters of the American Revolution.

In order to sell music, the music was marketed with uniquely colorful front cover illustrations to catch the eye of buyers. He was the first music publisher to use five-color lithography for his sheet music.  For this reason alone, music published by his firm has become highly collectible in the modern era and has latterly aroused interest in the composer.

To further boost sales, he marketed his music as "descriptives" and ascribed certain sections of the music to allude to certain depictions of events on the cover illustration. This type of publication alludes to its being comparable to program music whilst never achieving the requisite complexity. The marketing of the pieces as "descriptives" (often a latter enhanced recycling of earlier published material) enabled the same music to be sold a second time around to the wide market of beginner-level pianists who had been accustomed to fare of this kind since Pridham's "Battle March of Delhi" in the mid-19th century. On this musical level, his true contemporaries were the British writers Ezra Read and Theo Bonheur of the same period.

Compositions

1894 

The Chariot Race or Ben Hur March

1895 

The Old Man's Story
The Stranger's Story Song, or Why Do Our Loved Ones Leave Us

1896 

Charge of the Light Brigade  
The Della Fox Little Trooper March
The Elk's Grand March
Get Off Cuba's Toes
Great New York
Loan Me A Nickel
The New York and Coney Island Cycle March
The Stranger's Story Waltz
Sweet Rosa Dugan From Hogan's Alley
What Might Have Been
Whisper Again Sweet I Love You
You'll Always Find A Welcome For You At Home Sweet Home

1898 

America Forever! March
He's Goin' to Hab a Hot Time Bye & Bye [w/Harry S. Miller]
The Ice Palace March
If You Were Only By My Side
Uncle Jasper's Jubilee
We'll Stand by the Flag

1899 

A Warmin' Up In Dixie

1900 

Dawn of the Century 

A Signal From Mars

1901 

Our Wedding Bells Will Ring Out Some Day [w/Arthur Treveylan]
When Johnny Goes A Camping [w/Vincent P. Bryan]
The Witch's Whirl

1902 

The Storm King

1903 

The Burning of Rome

1904 

The Circus Parade
The Romany Rye

1905 

The Jolly Blacksmiths 
Paul Revere's Ride  and

1906 

Silver Sleigh Bells

1907 

The Triumphant Banner
The Masquerade

1908 

The Home Coming March

1909 

Lincoln Centennial Grand March 
The Dashing Cavaliers

1912 

The Roaring Volcano
Ring Out, Wild Bells

1913 

Kaiser Jubilee March

1914 

Paull's Hesitiation Waltz
Herald of Peace March

1915 

Battle of the Nations 
Tipperary Guards

1916 

Woman Forever

1917 

Battle of Gettysburg

1918 

Pershing's Crusaders
Hurrah! For the Liberty Boys, Hurrah! 
 Words and music by Harry Kennedy. Re-arranged and revised by Paull. Say "au revoir" but not good bye.

1919  

American Wedding March
Spirit of France

1922 

Sheridan's Ride
Custer's Last Charge

1924 

The Four Horsemen of the Apocalypse
Spirit of the U. S. A.

1926 

Top of the World (published posthumously)

References

1858 births
1924 deaths
American male composers
American composers
Sheet music publishers (people)
American music publishers (people)
People from Berkeley County, West Virginia